Kiske/Somerville is the debut album of the melodic rock / heavy metal duet project Kiske/Somerville. The album features the collaboration of vocalist Michael Kiske (ex-Helloween, Unisonic, Place Vendome) with American singer Amanda Somerville (Aina, HDK, Trillium). The album was released on 24 September 2010 with cover art credited to Stanis W. Decker.

The album sees Mat Sinner (Primal Fear, Sinner) and Magnus Karlsson (Starbreaker, Primal Fear) handling most of the songwriting, with more contributions from the former After Forever guitarist Sander Gommans and Amanda Somerville herself. Mat Sinner oversaw the production and mixing of the songs at various recording studios in Europe.

Joining Kiske and Somerville for the shoot were bassist and main composer Mat Sinner, guitarist Sander Gommans, drummer Ramy Ali and keyboardist Jimmy Kresic (Voodoo Circle). The clips were directed by Martin Mueller of RCN TV.

The digital only release of the single, "Silence", on 20 August 2010, preceded the release of the full-length CD.

The bonus DVD includes videoclips of "Silence" and "If I Had a Wish", plus a 'Making of' documentary.

Track listing

Credits
Musicians
Michael Kiske - vocals
Amanda Somerville - vocals
Magnus Karlsson - lead and rhythm guitar, keyboards, additional production
Sander Gommans - lead guitar
Jimmy Kresic - keyboards
Mat Sinner - bass, backing vocals, producer
Martin Schmidt - drums
Ramy Ali - drums
Recorded at Stuntguitar Studios, Audiospezialist Studios, Level 10, Liquid Home Studio and HDK Studios
Achim Kohler - mixing and mastering at Indiscreet Studios.
Serafino Perugino - executive producer
Martin Mueller - videoclip director

Charts

References

External links
 Frontier Records official site
 Michael Kiske's official web site
 Michael Kiske's official fan-club site
 Kiske/Somerville lyrics

2010 debut albums
Vocal duet albums
Frontiers Records albums
Kiske/Somerville albums